Gul-e-Rana is a Pakistani actress and politician active in television industry since decades. She is the mother of musician Asim Azhar. She later joined politics and contested in General Elections 2018.

Personal life 

Rana was married but later divorced, from which he has a son Asim Azhar, a singer and an actor.

Career 
Rana made her television debut in 2010 with Syed Mohammad Ahmed's Shaista Shaista, after which she appeared in a number of television serials. She is better known for her negative roles, such as Pyar Ke Sadqay, Aakhir Kab Tak and Pyar Deewangi Hai.

Television

References

External links

Living people
Year of birth missing (living people)
21st-century Pakistani actresses
Pakistani television actresses
Pakistani women comedians